The Podesva Trener (English: Trainer), also called the Trener Baby, is a Czech ultralight aircraft that was designed by Tomas Podesva and produced by Podesva Air of Uničov. The aircraft a faithful 80% scale reproduction of the Zlin 126 and is supplied as plans, as a kit for amateur construction or as a complete ready-to-fly-aircraft.

By April 2018 the company website had been taken down and the aircraft seems to be out of production.

Design and development
Podesva designs and builds reproductions of famous aircraft on a custom basis for customers. The Trener was designed to comply with the Fédération Aéronautique Internationale microlight rules. It features a cantilever low-wing, a two-seats-in-tandem enclosed cockpit under a framed canopy, fixed conventional landing gear and a single engine in tractor configuration.

The aircraft fuselage is made from welded steel tubing, with the wings made from aluminum sheet. The standard engine available is the  Walter Mikron IIIb four cylinder, four-stroke powerplant.

Operational history
Reviewer Marino Boric described the design in a 2015 review as "a faithful reproduction of the classic aerobatic Zlin 126 aircraft, down to the last detail...The handling of this two-seater is impressive."

Specifications (Trener)

References

External links
 Former location of official website

2000s Czech ultralight aircraft
Homebuilt aircraft
Single-engined tractor aircraft